Battle of Langensalza can refer to
 Battle of Langensalza (1075), victory of Henry IV over Saxon nobles
 Battle of Langensalza (1761), an engagement between French forces and allied Prussian and Hanoverian forces during the Seven Years' War
 Battle of Langensalza (1866), overall Prussian victory over the Hanoverian Army.